Matthias Sindelar (10 February 1903 – 23 January 1939) was an Austrian professional footballer. Regarded as one of the greatest Austrian players of all time, Sindelar notably played for Austria Vienna and the Austria national football team.

He played as a centre-forward for the celebrated Austrian national side of the early 1930s that became known as the Wunderteam, which he captained at the 1934 World Cup. Known as "The Mozart of football" or Der Papierene ("The Paper Man") for his slight build, he was renowned as one of the finest pre-war footballers, known for his fantastic dribbling ability and creativity. He was voted the best Austrian footballer of the 20th Century in a 1999 poll by the International Federation of Football History and Statistics (IFFHS) and was named Austria's sportsman of the century a year before.

With the Wunderteam, Sindelar was one of the key elements of their developing formation and style of play as it evolved into a 2-3-5. According to specialists like Paul Dietschy, this formation provided "such fluidity to the Austrian system", leading it it's earning the nickname of "the Viennese whirlpool". Although the Wunderteam regularly lacked efficiency, Sindelar's individual technical skill and vision often compensated for these issues.

Early years
Of Czech descent, Sindelar was born Matěj Šindelář in Kozlov, Moravia, then part of the Austro-Hungarian Empire, the son of Jan Šindelář, a blacksmith, and his wife Marie (née Švengrová). Despite occasional claims that Sindelar was of Jewish origin, the family was Catholic. These claims most likely arise from his main club, Austria Vienna's connection to Vienna's Jewish populatiom.

They moved to Vienna in 1905 and settled in the predominantly working-class district of Favoriten, which had a large Czech-speaking community. Young Matěj, whose name would be Germanized as Matthias, began playing football in the streets with the other children of the neighbourhood, many of whom were immigrants from Bohemia and Moravia. Notably, he grew up alongside his future Austrian teammate Josef Bican.

According to many sources, upon the death of his father Sindelar took up a job as either an apprentice mechanic or a locksmith; during this time, he also had many other odd-jobs, such as selling sporting goods to the people of Vienna.

Club career
Sindelar began his footballing career with Hertha Vienna, whom he joined in 1918. This opportunity arose when, at the age of fifteen, he was spotted by a scout, who signed him up for Hertha's youth teams. Already considered to be "an excellent dribbler and finisher" as a teenager, Sindelar had quickly progressed into the first team by the early 1920s.

Playing in the blue and white jersey of Hertha, Sindelar quickly learned to compensate for his rather frail, infantile physique through the development of his high-level technique, allowing him "to dodge and dribble at will his opponents, and to squeeze with disconcerting ease (through gaps in (sic)) the opposing defenses ”. It is these characteristics which make him obtain the nickname of “der Papierene” ("the Paper man").

Sindelar quickly earnt his keep at Hertha Vienna, scoring his first goals in the national championship in particular thanks to his quick feet, and becoming a vital cog in their team. Both his and the club's fortunes took a turn for the worse, however, as Sindelar suffered a serious knee injury in May 1923, making him indefinitely unavailable. Concurrently, Hertha also went through a great economic crisis and Sindelar, as well as some of his teammates, were made redundant. In his time at Hertha Vienna, Sindelar scored 4 goals in 23 matches.

Austria Vienna
Now a free agent but still injured, Sindelar consulted the club doctor of SV Amateure who suggested that he should undergo meniscus surgery. At the time, such an operation was operation considered quite risky as it could mark the end of his career. Feeling that such a risk was necessary to take Sindelar had the surgery and, once successfully healed, signed for SV Amateure in 1924, who were at the time Austrian league and cup champions. In 1926, SV Amateure would become professional and take on their current name of FK Austria Vienna.

His time at Austria Vienna coincided with one of the club's most successful spells pre-War. He helped the team win the Austrian Cup five times across an eleven year spell - in 1925, 1926, 1933, 1935 and 1936. He also won an 1. League title in 1926, and the Mitropa Cup twice, in 1933 and 1936 respectively. Much like his time at Hertha Vienna, Sindelar was a center forward and utilised his technically ability, talent on the ball, and eye for goal to overcome his physical disadvantages. He was also seen as a great leader in the pitch. Gifted with 'ankle-breaking' agility his ability to beat the defender one-on-one was often described as 'exceptional'. In this sense, he is often compared in terms of modern-day footballers to counterparts such as Lionel Messi.

Overall, in 703 matches for Austria Vienna he scored 600 goals and In 2001 was named in their Team of the Century.

Sindelar was arguably one of Europe's best and, in scope, most influential footballers of his generation, recognized for his ball control, passing and dribbling, and especially his creativity. There are anecdotal claims that some fans went attended Sindelar's games not only to see him play, but to get a better understanding of how football 'should' be played.

In 1938 he appeared as himself in the Austrian film Roxy and the Wonderteam.

International career

Austria national team
From 1926 to 1937, Sindelar was capped 43 times for his country, scoring 26 goals. He scored four goals in his first three international matches, including one in his debut match, a 2–1 victory over Czechoslovakia on 28 September 1926. Sindelar became an essential part of the Austrian Wunderteam that was coached by Hugo Meisl, until the two later had a falling out. Writer David Goldblatt described the events:

He made his international debut in 1926 and played well before falling out of favour with the disciplinarian Meisl. Four years in the international wilderness followed until Meisl was cornered by a gathering of the city's leading football commentators as he sat in the Ring Café in 1931. Everyone was arguing for Sindelar's recall and Meisl changed his mind. Sindelar played. Scotland were beaten and the Wunderteam – already disciplined, organized, hardworking and professional – acquired their playmaker and inspiration, that vital spark of unpredictability.

1927-30 Central European International Cup
while Austria had not quite earned the monicher of Wunderteam yet, a young Sindelar helped them to their first major international tournament performance, being a part of the squad that made Runners-up in the Central European International Cup.

1931-32 Central European International Cup
The Wunderteam started by winning the Central European International Cup: 1931–32, Sindelar scoring 4 goals to help Austria win its first and so far only international Trophy.

1933-35 Central European International Cup
This time around The Wunderteam finished as Runners-up. Sindelar scoring 3 goals to make him Austria's all-time top goalscorer at the Central European International Cup.

1934 World Cup
Sindelar and Austria made the whole their stage at the 1934 World Cup, where they truly earned their nickname of the "Wunderteam". The high point came with their win over Hungary in the quarterfinals, when Sindelar was matched up against centre-half György Sárosi, who would go on to claim a runners-up medal at the following World Cup in France. In a bruising encounter, one Hungarian was sent-off, and Johann Horvath, the Austrian midfielder, was injured and missed the semi-final against Italy. Austria was then defeated by the host nation, with Sindelar affected by the harsh marking of Luis Monti.

Austria v Germany 1938
On 3 April 1938, the Austrian team played Germany in the Prater Stadium in Vienna. This match was significant as, just a few weeks earlier Nazi Germany had annexed Austria (known as the Anschluss), and had absorbed the national team into that of Nazi Germany, ignoring their qualification for that summer's  World Cup. Thus, this would be Austria's last international match until after the Second World War. This was and is seen by many as a great tragedy for Austrian football as they feel that Austria were one of the favourites to lift that year's World Cup  trophy.

The match, dubbed the "Anschlussspiel" in German (lit. Anschluss game), was planned as a celebration by the Nazi regime of the Anschluss and Austria's "coming home to the Reich". At Sindelar's behest, the Austrian team played in red-white-red strips which mimicked the Austrian flag's colours instead of their traditional white and black strips. Austria squandered many easy goalscoring opportunities during the match in a way that looked deliberate. However, in the last 20 minutes, Sindelar and teammate Karl Sesta both scored as the game finished 2–0.
Sindelar is claimed  to have celebrated extravagantly in front of senior Nazi dignitaries.

International caps and goals
The following is a list of Sindelar's international appearances and goals with the Austria national football team.

Team record
In the 43 matches that Sindelar played, Austria had a total record of 25 victories, 11 draws, and just 7 losses, with Sindelar scoring 26 times.

Death and myth
Refusing to leave his home country, Sindelar refused to play for the new  German national team citing old age (by this point he was 35 years old) and injury as his excuse.

On 23 January 1939 both Sindelar and his girlfriend Camilla Castagnola were found dead at the apartment they shared in Vienna; the official verdict cited carbon monoxide poisoning as the cause. Different theories speculated that his death was an accident, suicide or murder.

Austrian writer Friedrich Torberg later dedicated the poem "Auf den Tod eines Fußballspielers" ("On the death of a footballer") to Sindelar. The poem suggested that he had committed suicide as a result of the German Anschluss of Austria in 1938. On the other hand, it has been thought and reported that his death was accidental, caused by a defective chimney. A neighbour had reported a defective chimney in the block a few days before Sindelar's death. However, in a 2000s documentary screened on the BBC, Egon Ulbrich, a lifelong friend of Sindelar, stated that a local official was bribed to record his death as an accident, which ensured that he would receive a state funeral. "According to the Nazi rules, a person who had been murdered or who has committed suicide cannot be given a grave of honour. So we had to do something to ensure that the criminal element involved in his death was removed," he stated. It has also been suggested that Sindelar was killed for his opposition for the Anschluss. The Gestapo notably had a file on him and had kept his café under surveillance.

Honours
Sindelar was ranked as Austria's best footballer of the twentieth century by the IFFHS, also ranking as the world's 22nd best. His career titles include:

Club 
Austria Wien
 1. Liga
 Winner: 1926
 Runner Up: (2) 1925, 1937
 Austrian Cup
 Winner: (5) 1925, 1926, 1933, 1935, 1936
 Mitropa Cup
 Winner: (2) 1933, 1936

International 
Austria
 FIFA World Cup 
 Semi-finals: 1934
 Central European International Cup
 Winner: 1931–32
 Runner-up: (2) 1927–30, 1933–35

Individual
 FIFA World Cup Silver Ball: 1934

References

External links
 Profile at the official web site of FK Austria
 Tribute web page
 Sindelar's play style transformation by arfsh.com
 Channel 4 News: Matthias Sindelar
 
 Player profile – Austria Archive
 HistoriasDeFútbol. Episodio 2 "Mathías Sindelar, un gol al nazismo"
|
|

1903 births
1939 deaths
People from Jihlava District
People from the Margraviate of Moravia
Austrian people of Czech descent
Austrian Roman Catholics
Austrian footballers
Austria international footballers
1934 FIFA World Cup players
FK Austria Wien players
Austrian Football Bundesliga players
Austrian football managers
FK Austria Wien managers
Association football forwards
Deaths from carbon monoxide poisoning
Death conspiracy theories
Burials at the Vienna Central Cemetery